"I Gotcha" is a song by Joe Tex. Originally intended for King Floyd, instead Tex recorded it himself in the late 1960s, but did not release it at that time. He decided to re-record it in late 1971 and released it as the B-side of "A Mother's Prayer", the first single from his 1972 album "I Gotcha". Mostly spoken in the form of an early rap song, with few singing passages, "I Gotcha" has the singer admonishing a woman for playing with his affections: "You never shouldn't have promised if you weren't gonna do it".

Radio DJs ended up playing this B-side song more than the A-side. This would result in Tex having his first major hit in five years as "I Gotcha" eventually peaked at Number 1 on the R&B chart and Number 2 on the Pop chart for two weeks, behind "The First Time Ever I Saw Your Face" by Roberta Flack and would sell around three million copies. Billboard ranked it as the Number 6 song of 1972. In Canada, the song reached Number 22. Tex would later re-record "I Gotcha" in a ballad-style for his 1978 album Rub Down.

Like other Tex songs, "I Gotcha" has been sampled in various hip hop and R&B songs over the years. Liza Minnelli performed the number for her 1972 television concert Liza with a Z. It is also featured on the soundtrack to the 1992 Quentin Tarantino film Reservoir Dogs. A shorter version of the song appears in Kermit's Swamp Years.

Later uses
"I Gotcha" was sampled in the 1973 break-in record, "Super Fly Meets Shaft" (US #31).

Jimmy Barnes version

In 1991, Australian rock singer Jimmy Barnes recorded and released "I Gotcha" as the first single from his fifth studio album, Soul Deep. It peaked at Number 6 in Australia and Number 27 in New Zealand.

Track listing
CD single (D11045)
 "I Gotcha"
 "I Gotcha" (Tex Mex 12" Mix)

Charts

Certifications

See also
List of number-one R&B singles of 1972 (U.S.)

References

External links
 "I Gotcha" song review  [] on AllMusic
 

1972 singles
1991 singles
Joe Tex songs
Song recordings produced by Buddy Killen
Songs written by Joe Tex
Jimmy Barnes songs